Compsopsectra is a genus of moths in the family Limacodidae.

Species 
 Compsopsectra elegans West, 1932
 Compsopsectra sundana Holloway, 1990

See also 
 List of Limacodidae genera

References 

 Holloway, Jeremy D., 1990, The Limacodidae of Sumatra. Heterocera Sumatrana Society 6: 9-77

External links 
 

 
 Compsopsectra at insectoid.info

Limacodidae genera
Limacodidae